Calhoun Middle School may refer to:

 Calhoun Middle School, in Calhoun, Georgia
 Calhoun Middle School, in Calhoun, Louisiana; see Ouachita Parish School Board
 Calhoun Middle School, in Denton, Texas; see Denton Independent School District